Charles-Edgar de Mornay (February 4, 1803 in Paris - December 5, 1878 in Fresneaux-Montchevreuil), was a French diplomat and the first French ambassador  to Morocco, a politician and collector of French painting.

He was a Gentleman of the Bedchamber of Charles X of France.

Mission to North Africa

In mid-October 1831 Louis Philippe I sent de Mornay on a mission to Abd al-Rahman of Morocco.
His task was to negotiate a peace treaty and a border delimitation with the Alawite emperor. Following the 
French conquest of Algeria the mission needed to establish neighbourly relations between the two countries.

His mission had an immediate success: On April 4, 1832 he was able to send a letter declaring to the general-in-chief of the staff of Algiers, Anne Jean Marie René Savary, that Morocco would abandon its claims on the region of Tlemcen and Oran, promise to remain neutral and withdraw their troops from Algeria.

At first Eugène Isabey had been approached to join the diplomatic mission to North Africa. However, when the painter returned from Algiers he had declined, unwilling to make a second trip to Africa. It was therefore Eugène Delacroix who had been chosen to accompany the mission, at his own expense. She was keen to find a pleasant traveling companion for her lover. Mornay and Delacroix dined together on New Year's Eve, accompanied by the actress.

In 1845 he was named a Peer of France.

Gallery

References

20th-century French diplomats
Ambassadors of France to Morocco
1803 births
1878 deaths